Naveen Nooli is an Indian film editor who works primarily in Telugu cinema. He won the National Film Award for Best Editing for Jersey (2019).

Career 
Nooli made his film debut with Login (2012), a Hindi film directed by his friend Sanjeev Reddy. He garnered acclaim for his work in Ladies & Gentlemen (2015). Music director Devi Sri Prasad, whom he worked with in S/O Satyamurthy (2015) recommended him to Sukumar and thus enabled him to become the editor for Nannaku Prematho (2016). In 2019, he worked on Jersey. In a review of the film by The Times of India, the reviewer wrote that "Naveen Nooli too does a good job with the editing, with the film, despite its long runtime and laggy bits, not ending up seeming like a cricket documentary".

Filmography

Awards

References

External links 

Living people
Telugu film editors
Hindi film editors
Year of birth missing (living people)
Indian film editors
Nandi Award winners
Telugu people
Film editors from Andhra Pradesh
Zee Cine Awards Telugu winners
Best Editor National Film Award winners